, or simply , is a Japanese science fiction media franchise created by Tomy that feature giant robots (or "mecha") called "Zoids". A Zoid is essentially a large mechanical animal, with designs being based on animals; including dinosaurs, insects, arachnids and mythological creatures.

The franchise started with a model-kit-based toy line and includes five main anime TV series (Chaotic Century, New Century, Fuzors, Genesis and Wild) as well as several video games and manga products.

Model kit lines
There have been a number of different Zoids model lines over the years, both in Japan and other countries. Between these lines, over 200 different designs have been released, some several times over. Several companies outside of Takara-Tomy have produced Zoids kits. This has led to Zoids being made as die-cast figures, highly detailed posing kits, smaller action figures and even PVC figurines.

Mechabonica
The predecessors to Zoids. Released in 1982, Mechabonica was technically not a Zoids line, but is counted as such by collectors as it consisted of three models that would later be re-released as the first three Zoids (Garius, Elephantus, and Glidoler). The line was not very successful and was quickly dropped by Tomy.

Starzeta
Starzeta was the Spanish version of the Mechabonica line. Since Tomy had no direct marketing power in Spain during the 80s the models were released under licence by a smaller company (Feber) but unfortunately the line performed even worse than its Japanese counterpart. The same 3 models were released but bizarrely they were given new color schemes; grey parts became silver and the dark blue caps became bright blue. The models were not given names but are listed as Starzeta I, II and III.

SZ IV (Garantula), SZ V (Aquadon) and SZ VI (Gorgodos) were supposedly planned as a continuation of the series but their release status is currently unknown.

The models are incredibly rare (even more so than the Japanese Mechabonica) and demand is boosted even further by their unique color schemes.

Original American release
TOMY sold the Mechabonica line in the United States and Europe in late 1982, under the name Zoids. The line was far more successful than Mechabonica, which led TOMY to reintroduce the line in Japan under the new name.

Later, a pair of original Zoids, the Power Zoids Tank and Serpent, were created exclusively for the European and North American markets and were never released in Japan. Other Zoids like the Bigasaur (renamed to Giant ZRK) were also released. Radio Shack released the Mammoth Zoid in the US at the same time. While not a part of the release, it is generally counted with them.
The Original American Release is commonly abbreviated as OAR by fans and collectors.

Original Japanese Release
In 1983, following the success of the OAR, TOMY reintroduced the Zoids line in Japan. The relaunched Japanese line, now entitled Zoids, was a success, running from 1983 until 1990. The Zoids line had its own "Battle Story" that was told serially on the backs of the model boxes and in catalogues.

Initially, the Zoids were divided into two distinct factions, the Helic Republic and the Zenebas Empire. In 1989, the Zenebas Empire was replaced with the Guylos Empire.

The Original Japanese Release is commonly abbreviated as OJR.

Original European Release
Zoids were also released in Europe, (and to a limited extent in Australia, South Africa and South-East Asia), from 1984 to 1987 by TOMY. The models in this release were a mixture of ones directly ported over from the OJR, as well as recolored Zoids, including the rare Ghost Zoids line. Additionally, the Tank and Serpent Power Zoids from the OAR were released. Most of the Zoids in the line were renamed.

The Zoids in the release were divided into two distinct factions, which are the Blue Guardians and the Red Mutants. The line had its own story told in the UK Zoids comic.

The Original European Release is commonly abbreviated as OER.

Robo Strux
Robo Strux were released in the US and Canada by TOMY, in 1985–86. All the Zoids in the line were OJR Zoids, however, some versions of the same model retained their original (OJR) color scheme, whereas other versions of the same model received a distinctive Robo Strux color scheme. Thus, the Robo Strux line had two differently colored releases of several models. Based on their color schemes, the Zoids were divided into two factions, the heroic Blue Guardians and the evil Red Mutants. However, there was no accompanying story or media.

Due to the lack of marketing and the relatively high prices of the models, Robostrux was rather short-lived.

Robostrux is commonly abbreviated as RS.

1:24 Scale Zoids
In 1988, TOMY launched a sub-line of the OJR, featuring larger-scale Zoids. The 1:24 line featured Zoids of similar size to existing ones, but scaled for larger pilots. Each kit came with a 3 inch tall action figure of the pilot. Like the regular Zoids line, the Zoids were divided into Helic and Zenebas factions.

The 1:24 Zoids were not a success, and were discontinued after a year.

Zevle
In 1990, TOMY re-released several of the 1:24 scale Zoids in a new line called Zevle. The Zoids were recolored from the OJR versions, and came with detailed, 3 inch tall action figures of the pilot and crew. The pilot figures were unpainted and on sprues, much like a model kit, and had to be assembled. The crew figures also came with accessories of guns and beam sabers. Zevle featured its own "Battle Story" on the boxes, but while it was similar to the Zoids Battle Story, it was unrelated to it.

Like the 1/24th Zoids, Zevle was a commercial failure and was discontinued.

Technozoids
Kenner acquired the rights to release Zoids in North America, releasing the Technozoids line in 1995–1996. The Zoids in the line were all recolors of earlier Zoids released in the OJR, although some were directly imported from the Zoids2 line. There were no distinct factions for the Zoids, and no backstory was given.

The Technozoids line was a failure and was discontinued after one year. A number of Zoids were left unreleased at the end of the line.

Technozoids is commonly abbreviated as TZ.

Zoids 2
TOMY released another line of Zoids in the UK and Europe (with a re-release in Australia and South-East Asia) in 1994. The Zoids 2 line featured very bright color schemes, with all the Zoids having at least some chromed parts. The Zoids also had unique stickers with odd swirling designs. The Zoids 2 line did not feature distinctive factions for the Zoids, but did have a backstory loosely based on (but not a continuation of) the UK Zoid comic, with the Zoids invading Earth and humanity's last hope being to turn the Zoids against each other.

Like Technozoids, Zoids 2 was eventually discontinued.

Zoids 2 is commonly abbreviated as Z2.

New Japanese Release
In 1999, TOMY relaunched the Zoids line in Japan, with subsequent releases elsewhere in Asia. Initially, the line consisted of recolored re-releases of older Zoids, but TOMY quickly began producing new Zoids designs. The Zoids were divided into Helic and Guylos factions, with the Zenebas Empire returning later. The OJR battle story was continued on the NJR boxes, with the Zoids Anime and Manga drawing on alternate versions of the New Battle Story's events.

The line was abruptly discontinued in August 2004. By the end of the line, there were still thirty-three Zoids from the OJR line that had yet to be re-released.

The New Japanese Release is unofficially abbreviated as NJR.

Customise Parts
Along with the re-launch of the Zoids line, TOMY also launched a line known as Customise Parts or simply CP. The line consisted of additional weapons and equipment that could be added onto Zoids models. The line was a mixture of new parts and re-issues of parts originally included in various OJR models (as well as the Empire and Republic Customization Kits).

The Customise Parts line was discontinued in 2002.

Blox
In 2002, TOMY introduced a new line of non-motorised Zoids called Blox, which featured flexible construction. Blox Zoids can be easily disassembled and combined with each other, as well as with regular Zoids.

Toys Dream Project
In 2002, Toys Dream Project began a line of limited Zoids releases. The line consisted of a mixture of new recolors of existing Zoids and re-releases of older versions of some Zoids in their OJR colors, as well as kits paired with uniquely colored customize parts.

Zoids: Build Customize Mobilize
Following the launch of the NJR, Hasbro licensed Zoids for release in North America and South-East Asia in 2001. Like the NJR, the line was divided into Republic and Empire factions, with the Anime providing the backstory. Initially, the Hasbro line consisted of just re-releases of Zoids from the NJR. However, they later began developing their own Zoid designs, as well as co-developing others with TOMY. Additionally, Hasbro had planned to re-release several OJR Zoids that had not been released in the NJR.

Although it was initially successful, Hasbro suspended the line in 2004, due to poor sales. The cancellation of the line left a number of new Zoids unreleased, including most of those not yet re-released by TOMY. Much of the leftover stock was later released by Hasbro in Australia and the UK.

In Australia and South-East Asia, these Zoids were released by TOMY. These countries were identical to Hasbro's Zoids, but featured TOMY branding on the box. In the UK the Zoids boxes featured slightly different logos to both Australia and the US. The UK release featured several Zoids designs and color schemes that were not available in the US.

Z-Builders
Any Blox Zoids that were released by Hasbro were sold as part of the line known as Z-Builders. Most of the Z-Builders were re-releases of the NJR Blox line, but the line included several Hasbro-designed Zoids, as well as individual releases of Blox Zoids that did not occur in Japan. The Z-Builders line was suspended alongside the motorized models. Z-Builders was released in Australia and the Pacific featuring TOMY branding instead of Hasbro branding.

Fuzors
In late 2004, TOMY launched a new Zoids line to tie into the Zoids: Fuzors anime that was then showing on Japanese TV. The line was composed entirely of recolors of older Blox and Zoids. Some models were altered slightly, or packaged with additional parts, mainly to allow different Zoids to connect (or "fuse"). The line also featured a number of Zoids that were previously only released in North America.

The line was abruptly halted in early 2005, with several items unreleased.

Fuzors is commonly abbreviated as FZ.

Genesis
In early 2005, another new Zoid line was launched, to tie into the Zoids: Genesis anime. The line consists of a mixture of old designs, new designs and older designs with new parts. The line is most notable for the much-anticipated reissues of Houndsoldier and Gilvader.

Reactions to the line were mixed; the re-releases of older designs (which included several OJR Zoids not previously re-released) were well received. The new designs, namely the Bio-Zoids which had rubber armor, did not do so well, having been plagued by quality control issues and production errors.

Genesis is commonly abbreviated as GZ. An alternate abbreviation, GB, is used for the Bio-Zoids released as part of this line.

Neo-Blox
Released in May 2006, the Neo-Blox are an improvement on the previous Blox line, primarily due to the greater range of poseability the 'Blox and peg' connection system has.

Two sublines have also been released. The first is the Legends Series, which features Zoids from previous releases, but redesigned to be the same size as the Neo-Blox Zoids, and modified to use the same connector system. The second are the Custom Blox; subline appeared to be on hold, with Tomy instead focusing on the Legend Blox sub-line. With the cancellation of all unreleased Neo-Blox in early 2007, the line was effectively dead.

The Neo-Blox is abbreviated as either NBZ or NB. Alternate abbreviations are used for the Legends Series (LB) and the Custom Blox (CBZ).

Academy Zoids
Academy, a company from Korea better known for model airplanes and ships, re-released many of the NJR Zoid models, as well as some Zoids from the Customize Parts, Fuzors and Genesis series. In most cases, these Academy Zoids have nearly identical packaging to their Japanese predecessors save for the Korean language and a sticker bearing the Academy logo. Though the quality of the Academy Zoids were on par with their Japanese counterparts in the early 2000s, the age and repeated use of some molds, such as Command Wolf and Liger Zero, has caused degradation in the line. The line continues to sell Zoids exclusively in Korean markets.

High-end Master Model
Starting in late 2006, the High-end Master Model line, commonly abbreviated HMM, is a joint effort between Tomy and Kotobukiya. The line advertises high-quality, highly detailed, pose-able model kits based on designs of existing Zoids.

Evo Drive Zoids
Miniature Zoids
Starting in late 2006, the High-end Master Model line, commonly abbreviated HMM, is a joint effort between Tomy and Kotobukiya. The line advertises high-quality, highly detailed, pose-able model kits based on designs of existing Zoids.

Zoids Graphics
Released in Summer 2007 onward, the Graphics line are reissues of the OJR model kits released in the 1980s.  They feature the model kit in special windowed packaging along with bonus parts or miniature figures and a booklet with early battle story information.

Zoids 25th: Rebirth Century
Starting in 2008 as part of the line's 25th anniversary, this new Zoids line contains both re-releases of 80s Zoids and entirely new designs. The backstory is set between the end of the original line and the start of the new Japanese release, covering the Zoidians' efforts to rebuild after the meteor disaster and the conflicts that come with it.

Zoids Anime 10th Anniversary
Starting in 2009, as a tribute to both the NJR Zoids Release and the Chaotic Century Anime series, the Anime 10th Anniversary is a limited line of correctly colored model kits based on those piloted by characters in the Anime series. The line abruptly stopped after just two of the kits were released. Zoids: Chaotic Century is what this 10th anniversary is based upon. It was only ended in 1999.

Revoltech Zoids
A company called Kaiyodo released four Zoids as Revoltech figures under the Yamaguchi line. Two Zoid types, the Blade Liger and the Geno Breaker, were produced with the Liger coming in three different colors. These Zoids were made to be highly pose-able, having more joints than any Revoltech before. These Zoids are smaller than the motorized Zoid models but larger than the Hasbro action figures.

Yamato Zoids
Yamato released two Shield Ligers and a set of Beam-Cannons for the Zoids between 2010 and 2012. These Zoids had die-cast metal parts as well as fine details and many points of articulation for movable parts. The action models dwarfed their predecessors in size and weight. The first Shield Liger was colored like the hero Zoid of the Chaotic Century series and included three small character figures. The second was painted black and silver and included the Beam Cannon like the limited NJR model, the Shield Liger DCS-J, it was based on. The Yamato Shield Liger was released in the United States and is the only line to be sold in the U.S. since Z-Builders.

Modeler's Spirit Series
For the 30th anniversary of Tomy's main Zoids line, the franchise was treated to a new line of Zoids kits. Abbreviated MSS, the Modeler's Spirit Series were produced by TOMYTEC at a 1:144 scale, much smaller than previous lines. These Zoids are not motorized but do feature posing gimmicks similar to Mobile Suit models, which have used the word 'gimmick' for movable parts longer. Zoids in the MSS line also include a display base. The first MSS Zoids, released in January 2013, were a Shield Liger and Hammer Rock.

Zoids Original
Another event for the 30th anniversary was announced on Takara-Tomy's main Zoids web page. Titled Zoids Original, the line features redesigned motorized kits. As with other core Zoids lines, the new series includes a tie-in Battle Story. A model called the Mirage Fox was the first kit to be released in the new line.

Battle story
 "Battle story" is a fictitious timeline of events that features on the boxes, manuals and cataloges of some Zoid model kits. Battle Story allows collectors to piece together information about the Zoids universe from the perspective of certain Zoids, and their roles in the various timelines. None of the English-language model kits feature this story.

Original battle story
Beginning fairly early after the start of the original Japanese Zoid releases, the battle story first introduced the conflict between two rival nations: the Helic Republic and Zenebas Empire. Their main weapons were Zoids, living war machines built from metal-based lifeforms native to planet Zi. The Zenebas Zoids were mostly red and silver and more armored, the Helic more skeletal and favoring blue and grey.

The line expanded and drew in fans, and was thus given a proper ongoing story, with the creators wanting to appeal to fans of science fiction and animation.  The two nations' conflict turned into an ongoing series of stories included on the boxes and published in various magazines and books. History of Zoids, published in 1985, covered Zi's history as a planet wrecked by natural disasters and conflict, King Helic's uniting the original tribes and formation of the Republic, the Empire's bitter splitting off after his son Helic II took over and the younger Zenebas was betrayed by the era's politicians, and much of the earlier battles in the resulting war over territory on the Central Continent.

As more advanced model kits were added to the line, a human element was added to the story: mainly, a ship from Earth (the Globally 3) crashlanding on Zi. Earth technology made its way to both sides, accelerating the arms race and making for many stronger Zoids.

In 1986, the Ultrasaurus was released, and billed in-story as the machine that would defeat the Empire. It nearly succeeded, but Zenebas and his forces fled to the Dark Continent Nyx, soon returning with new-model Zoids like the Death Saurer. The Republic was driven back and forced to hold the Empire off with guerrilla warfare in the mountains, paving the way for the brief 1/24 scale line (notable for featuring the Battle Rover as the winner of a fan design contest).  The Republic's counterattack came in the form of the Mad Thunder, and as Zenebas again turned to the Dark Continent for help, he was betrayed by Guylos, whose new "Dark Army" Zoids attacked and absorbed the Empire Army.

1989 thus marked a drastic change in the line's focus, the first catalogue even calling it "Zoids New Century" (a title unrelated to the anime series Zoids New Century /Zero). The more ambiguous conflict became more "good versus evil", with Guylos described as having a "merciless, cruel fighting style [...] beyond imagination" in Tomy's material, and Shogakukan's version of the battle story abandoning telling things from both sides to give only the viewpoint of a Republic soldier portrayed as a hero. There were no windup kits released after the Cannonfort in April 1989, the toys instead focusing on "Gradeups", curvy techno-organic designs with vacuum metalized parts, build-it-yourself motor boxes, and interchangeable custom parts.

The line ended in the late months of 1990, King Gojulas and Descat marking the final designs.  Battle story Zi came down to a final showdown between the nigh-unstoppable King Gojulas and various Dark Army Zoids (including Gilvader), only to have the conflict cut short as a comet struck Zi's third moon, raining down meteor destruction and leaving the entire planet in disarray.

New battle story
The Zoids revival in 1999 included both an anime and a new battle story. After decades of peace, the current Emperor died, leaving only the young Rudolph as his heir. His regent, Prozen, took the opportunity to resume the conflict between the Guylos Empire and the Republic.  Early on, both sides used their past Zoids, the model line focusing entirely on reissues of popular past kits.

As technology advanced, entirely new designs were produced, the first being the Rev Raptor and Geno Saurer. Many of them were also tie ins to the Chaotic Century anime, including special pilot figures of characters who used them while the Zoids did different things in the battle story. The accelerating arms race came to a head with the Death Stinger, which proved an uncontrollable berserker and only served to further the Guylos Empire's gradual loss.

Their retreat to the Dark Continent was not as it seemed, and in 2004 (four years after the first anime series finished its run), Prozen was revealed to be Zenebas' son...and the current ruler of the Republic his daughter under the alias Louise Elena Camford. The entire war until now had been a ruse to weaken both nations, and in a bitter coup ending with his own death Prozen engineered the rise of Neo Zenebas. His son took over the reins, driving the Republic forces back to the Eastern Continent.

The toyline shifted to match, introducing the new posable "Blox" kits (first sold in 2002) as the creation of humans who had fled there to remain neutral in the original conflict. They sold their work to both sides during the Republic's bid to regain their homeland. The ensuing battles—and the battle story portion of the toyline—ended with the Republic reclaiming their capital, forcing the Zenebas Empire back to the western half of the Central Continent.

Three Tigers
Providing a glimpse into Zi's future and released in 2004, the Three Tigers line consisted of all of six kits: three legendary Tiger-type Zoids (one formed via a combination of two separate kits) and the Dekalt Dragon (also a combination). It was very closely followed by the Fuzors line and its direct anime tie-in (also in 2004), and featured a similar setting: Zoids are owned mainly by private citizens, with fightworthy ones restricted to peacekeeping forces and licensed sports battlers.

Two large Zoid manufacturing corporations, ZOITEC and Zi-Arms, became considerable powers on Zi. Discovering the cores of ancient tiger Zoids, they set out to create their own versions. Part of Zi-Arms proved to have an ulterior motive: seizing power and reviving the glory days of the Empire with the Dekalt Dragon, Brastle Tiger, and a Mega Death Saurer. The two ZOITEC Tigers (Whitz and Rayse) team up with a rebelling Brastle to stop the Saurer, however ... and then vanish, the story booklet included with the Brastle Tiger kit describing them as "disappearing back into legend".

Rebirth Century
While the old battle story and the 1999 revival left nearly thirty years post meteor disaster undetailed, Tomy's Rebirth Century revival (2008–2010) picks up where the old story left off.  After retelling the final battle with King Gojulas, it moves on to a Zi torn by magnetic storms and faction tensions, using it as a reason to rerelease both old kits (Gilvader and King Gojulas included) and new designs.

Onslaught
For the 30th anniversary of the OJR line, Takara-Tomy revived the Battle Story on the main Zoids website. Prior to the anniversary, this story was released as a book series titled Zoids Concept Art in 2010. Though the overall plot is the same, some differences between the OJR and the Onslaught version occur. Also, the new version of the Battle Story is digitally illustrated with highly stylized Zoids instead of featuring pictures of the actual Zoids models like the older lines did. Episodes of this story can be viewed on the Tomy's main Zoids web page.

Anime
The six anime series pertaining to Zoids are: Zoids: Chaotic Century and its sequel series Zoids: Guardian Force, Zoids: New Century Zero, Zoids: Fuzors, Zoids: Genesis, and Zoids Wild. The first four series take place on the fictitious planet Zi. Zoids Wild is set on a post-apocalyptic version of Earth. Chaotic Century and Guardian Force aired as one series in the US, but they are considered two separate series by Takara Tomy.

Chaotic Century (1999)

Zoids: Chaotic Century is the first two Zoids anime series and consists of Chaotic Century and Guardian Force. Its setting is loosely based on that of Battle Story, and follows Van Flyheight as he meets an amnesiac girl called Fiona and an organoid called Zeke. As the series progresses, Van meets various opponents, such as Raven, and friends, like Moonbay and Irvine, and eventually ends up helping Fiona in her quest to regain her memory and to find a mysterious entity called the "Zoid Eve". Their quest takes them into the thick of an ongoing war between the two factions of the Helic Republic and the Guylos Empire.

In the US the story of Chaotic Century is split into two seasons, with a time skip in the middle. In Japan Guardian Force is considered the second series. Three to four years after the initial arc ("Chaotic Century"), the second story (Guardian Force) begins. The two warring nations seen in the first arc have made peace, and to ensure it remains, they establish a joint military task force called the Guardian Force. Van becomes a part of this force, and after some time again goes searching for the elusive Zoid Eve. On the way, he meets up with both old and new friends and foes.

Despite being the first series created in Japan, Chaotic Century was the second series to be broadcast in English, following New Century.

As well as the anime series, there was a Chaotic Century manga published in Japan. It was later reproduced in English in North America by Viz Communications, and in Singapore in English by Chuang Yi. There are significant differences between the anime and manga, becoming more striking in the later issues.

New Century (2001)

Zoids: New Century takes place some time after the events of Guardian Force, however, aside from a few cameo appearances, there is no direct relation to the past series. In New Century Zoid battles have become a tournament-based fighting competition. The main character is Bit Cloud, a junk dealer, who forms part of the Blitz Team. He becomes a pilot of their Zoid, the Liger Zero, a temperamental Zoid that previously had been unpilotable. Bit and Liger form a partnership and end up joining the Blitz Team in their various league matches. He is aided by his teammates, Leena Toros, Brad Hunter, Jamie Hemeros, as well as their leader, Dr. Steve Toros.

Along the way, Bit's unique Zoid gets the attention of the Backdraft Group, an organization who is trying to take over Zoid battles and make them more "interesting" by using illicit battles, often with no rules or regard to pilot safety. The Backdraft attempts to acquire the Liger Zero by any means possible.

New Century Zero has a number of animation cameos with Zoids from Chaotic Century and Guardian Force, which are the cause of much fan speculation but not explained.  Moonbay's Gustav can be seen in the background in one of the later episodes, the Backdraft shoots judge satellites down with a Death Stinger tail, the Death Saurer appearing as a model and in a background TV show, the three Geno Saurers that attack Berserk Fury, and the Ultrasaurus wreck on which Bit Cloud claims victory carries the Gravity Cannon on its side.

This was the first Zoids series to appear on American television, airing in Cartoon Network's Toonami block.

Fuzors (2003)

Zoids: Fuzors follows the adventures of team Mach Storm and RD, a novice Liger Zero pilot. They live in the technologically advanced Blue City, competing in Zoid battles.  When a top team is wiped out by a pair of Zoids able to combine, it leads to a series of discoveries relating to special "Fuzor" Zoids and combinations: RD's Liger Zero ends up partnered with the Fire Phoenix and later the Jet Falcon.

There's something more sinister lurking behind the sports battles and RD's rivalry with team Savage Hammer. As the series unfolds RD and his friends Helmut, Sigma, Hop, Sweet and Matt get caught up in a plot to take over the city. Eventually RD discovers the secret behind the mysterious "Alpha Zoid" and with the help of pilots from all over the city, defeats the Seismosaurus holding it under siege.

About half-way through the series, the show was removed from America's Cartoon Network, ending on a cliffhanger. This was most likely a result of flagging ratings and toy sales, although its timeslot did not help matters. However, the full series aired in Australia and was later shown in Japan, getting full DVD releases in both countries.

Genesis (2005)

Zoids: Genesis aired in 2005. At a certain point in time, there was a great quake on Planet Zi. An enormous crack ran through the planet, stretching as far as the seabeds to the high mountains. Volcanoes erupted with fire, and the sky was covered in darkness. Many cities were destroyed as they were swallowed in large areas, sinking underwater. This was known as "God's Fury."

Before this large series of natural disasters, all civilizations were at their peak. All were destroyed by the disasters, and it was several thousand years before the inhabitants of Zi were able to re-establish themselves in any meaningful form. Survivors of the disasters gathered together and formed new civilizations; these groups searched for Zoids that are buried underground for human use.

The story begins in a village whose most precious item, a giant blade, is worshipped as a holy symbol. Ruuji, a teenage boy, discovers an ancient Liger-type Zoid, the Murasame Liger, while on a deep water salvage operation. His village is suddenly attacked by skeletal "Bio-Zoids" intent on securing the powerful Generator located in the village. During the attack, Ruuji awakens Murasame Liger and fends off the Bio-Zoids, however the Generator on which the village depends becomes damaged in subsequent attacks. Seeking to repair it, Ruuji sets off on a journey to find a mechanic capable of fixing a generator.

Wild (2018)

Zoids Wild is the newest Zoids anime series. It began airing on July 7, 2018 on Mainichi Broadcasting System and Tokyo Broadcasting System. It is notable that characters are depicted riding on top of Zoids rather than within an enclosed cockpit as in previous Zoids media.

UK Zoids comics

In the 1980s, a Zoids tie-in strip was published in the Marvel UK title Secret Wars. On the back of this, it gained its own weekly title, Spider-Man and Zoids. This story has no continuity with any Japanese anime (which didn't exist at the time) and it was created to go along with the original UK (and subsequently Australian) release of model kits. The comic is notable for featuring early work by Grant Morrison, including the epic and apocalyptic Black Zoid storyline.

References

External links
Takara-Tomy's official Zoids site 
TOMYTEC's official  Zoids site 
Sho-Pro's official Zoids anime site 
Zoidstar UK Zoids Comics

1980s toys
Fictional extraterrestrial robots
Fictional giants
Fictional robots
Mass media franchises
Shogakukan franchises
Takara Tomy
Takara Tomy franchises
Toonami